The 2019 Belarusian Mixed Doubles Curling Championship was held from December 12 to 16, 2018 at the Minsk-Arena in Minsk, Belarus. The winners of this championship represented Belarus at the 2019 World Mixed Doubles Curling Championship.

Teams
The teams are listed as follows:

Round Robin

Group A

Group B

Playoffs

Final standings

References

Belarusian Mixed Doubles
Curling Mixed Doubles Championship
Belarusian Mixed Doubles Curling Championship
Belarusian Mixed Doubles Curling
Sports competitions in Minsk
Belarusian